The Killing of John Lennon is a 2006 biographical film about Mark David Chapman's plot to kill musician John Lennon. The film was written and directed by Andrew Piddington and stars Jonas Ball, Robert C. Kirk and Thomas A. McMahon.

A British-American co-production, it was not released in the United States until 2008 and received much less attention than the similarly themed American-produced independent film Chapter 27, released the year prior. The film received mixed reviews from critics.

Premise 
The film follows Mark David Chapman three months prior to the Lennon assassination and contains flashbacks to Chapman's earlier life and upbringing, while also exploring his infatuation with J.D. Salinger's 1951 novel The Catcher in the Rye and the links between this and his motivation for the killing.

Cast

John Lennon, George Harrison, Paul McCartney and Ringo Starr appear as themselves via archive footages from 1960s, Ted Koppel appears Himself as News Anchor from ABC News on 9 December 1980, and President Ronald Reagan also appears himself as archive footage from 1981 president attempt assassination.

Reception 
On review aggregator Rotten Tomatoes, the film holds an approval rating of 39% based on 36 reviews, with an average rating of 5.01/10. The website's critics consensus reads: "Despite a committed performance by newcomer Jonas Ball, The Killing of John Lennon is ultimately a flimsy character study." On Metacritic, the film has a weighted average score of 49 out of 100, based on 10 critics, indicating "mixed or average reviews".

See also
 Murder of John Lennon

References

External links
 
 
 
 

2006 biographical drama films
2006 films
Biographical films about criminals
Biographical films about musicians
British biographical drama films
The Beatles in film
British films set in New York City
Films about John Lennon
Cultural depictions of Yoko Ono
Cultural depictions of the Beatles
2006 drama films
2000s English-language films
2000s British films